Ladislav Benhák is a former Czechoslovak slalom canoeist who competed from the mid-1970s to the early 1980s. He won two medals in the C-2 team event at the ICF Canoe Slalom World Championships with a gold in 1977 and a silver in 1975.

References

External links 
 Ladislav BENHAK at CanoeSlalom.net

Czechoslovak male canoeists
Living people
Year of birth missing (living people)
Medalists at the ICF Canoe Slalom World Championships